The N7 or National Highway 7 is a national highway in Ghana that begins at Sawla where it intersects N12 and runs east through Larabanga to Fufulso where it also intersects N10 in the Savannah Region.

See also 
 Ghana Road Network

References

Roads in Ghana